C2C may stand for:

Entertainment
 C2C (group) French DJ group
 C2C (studio), a Japanese animation studio
 C2C: Country to Country, a country music festival in London
 Cover to Cover tour, a 1991 tour by George Michael
 Coast to Coast AM, a syndicated AM talk radio show

Technology
 C2C (cable system), linking east Asia and the United States
 Click-to-call, a web technology to immediately initiate calls to another person
 Consumer-to-consumer, electronic transactions between consumers through a third party
 Cradle-to-cradle design, a biomimetic approach to the design of products

Train
 City to Coast, an English train operating company

Other
 Coast to Coast Athletic Conference, a US college athletic conference
 Copy to China, when a Chinese company copies the business model of a successful foreign company
 Sea to Sea Cycle Route, a bicycle route in England